Roberto Morinini (18 July 1951 – 16 March 2012) was a Swiss football striker and later manager.

References

1951 births
2012 deaths
Swiss men's footballers
Neuchâtel Xamax FCS players
AC Bellinzona players
FC Locarno players
Association football forwards
Swiss football managers
AC Bellinzona managers
FC Locarno managers

FC Lugano managers
U.S. Avellino 1912 managers
S.S. Fidelis Andria 1928 managers
Servette FC managers
Angers SCO managers
Yverdon-Sport FC managers
FC Luzern managers
Expatriate football managers in Italy
Swiss expatriate sportspeople in Italy
Expatriate football managers in France
Swiss expatriate sportspeople in France
People from Bellinzona
Sportspeople from Ticino